Mareuil-Caubert is a commune in the Somme department in Hauts-de-France in northern France.

Geography

Population

Places of interest
The 12th-16th century church of Saint-Christophe, classed as a « monument historique ».

See also
Communes of the Somme department

References

Communes of Somme (department)